Hótel Búðir (Hotel Budir) is a hotel built near Búðir, situated on a lava field on the westernmost tip of the Snaefellsnes peninsula in west Iceland. The hotel affords views over the Atlantic coast and the glacier-topped Snæfellsjökull volcano and glacier, and is located in a protected nature reserve.

The hotel is a three-hour drive north from Keflavík International Airport.

History
The hotel originally opened as a guesthouse and fish restaurant in 1947 on the site of an old apartment-store complex. It was converted to a limited-liability company in 1956. Icelandic author and Nobel prize winner Halldor Laxness was a frequent guest in the hotel, writing in a room which had views over the Snæfellsjökull glacier. The Icelandic painter Johannes Kjarval also stayed there.

The hotel was completely destroyed by a fire on 21 February 2001, and the current hotel building was constructed on the site, opening as a hotel on 14 June 2003. The hotel now has 28 bedrooms, varying in size, aspect and amenities, and the hotel restaurant can seat eighty people.

Local amenities and activities
The only other building in the vicinity is Búðir church, a tiny black wooden nineteenth century building, just a few minutes' walk from the hotel. Some hotel guests use Búðir as a wedding venue.

Other activities include horse riding, glacier tours, sailing and hiking.

Gallery

See also
 List of restaurants in Iceland

References

External links

Hotels in Iceland
Restaurants in Iceland